João "Johnny" Lucas de Souza Cardoso (born September 20, 2001) is an American professional soccer player who plays as a right midfielder or defensive midfielder for  Internacional and the United States national team.

Early life
Johnny was born in Denville Township, New Jersey, United States, to Brazilian parents and moved to Brazil when he was three months old. He had stints at Avaí and Criciúma before moving to the youth academy of Internacional.

Professional career
Johnny made his professional debut with Internacional in a 3–1 Campeonato Brasileiro Série A win over Atlético Mineiro on September 15, 2019.

International career
Eligible to represent both Brazil and the United States, Johnny received his first call-up to the United States under-23 training camp in October 2019. He received his first call up to the senior United States squad for matches against Wales and Panama in November 2020.

Johnny was subsequently called up again to the United States under-23 team for the 2020 CONCACAF Men's Olympic Qualifying Championship, in which the United States failed to qualify for the Olympics.

Career statistics

Club

International

References

External links
 
 Johnny Cardoso at playmakerstats.com (English version of ogol.com.br)
 Internacional Profile

2001 births
Living people
People from Denville, New Jersey
Soccer players from New Jersey
Sportspeople from Morris County, New Jersey
American soccer players
United States men's international soccer players
United States men's under-23 international soccer players
United States men's youth international soccer players
American sportspeople of Brazilian descent
Brazilian footballers
Association football midfielders
Campeonato Brasileiro Série A players
Expatriate footballers in Brazil
Sport Club Internacional players